The 1986 Iowa State Cyclones football team represented Iowa State University as a member of the Big Eight Conference during the 1986 NCAA Division I-A football season. The Cyclones were led by fourth-yead head coach Jim Criner for the first nine games of the season before he was fired and replaced by Chuck Banker as interim head coach. Iowa State compiled an overall record of 6–5 with a mark of 3–4 in conference play, placing fifth in the Big 8. The team played home games at Cyclone Stadium in Ames, Iowa.

Schedule

Game summaries

at Iowa

Oklahoma

Nebraska

References

Iowa State
Iowa State Cyclones football seasons
Iowa State Cyclones football